Nagoya City Tram (名古屋市電) was a tram service in the Japanese city of Nagoya. The service dates back to 1898 and was operating until 1974. Responsible for its operation was the Transportation Bureau City of Nagoya.

Some of the old trams were saved and are kept in the Nagoya City Tram & Subway Museum and the Nagoya City Science Museum.

External links 

Rail transport in Nagoya
Tram transport in Japan
Nagoya
Railway lines closed in 1974
1974 disestablishments in Japan